Bucephalus (foaled 1764) was a British Thoroughbred racehorse. He won the Subscription Purse at York in 1768, but is best known for racing against the undefeated Eclipse in a match race in 1770.

Background
Bucephalus was a chestnut colt foaled in 1764 and bred by H. B. Osbaldeston. He was a son of the undefeated and multiple times Champion sire Regulus and a Partner mare. Bucephalus was a full brother to Sultan and Sultana, and a half-brother to Constantine.

Racing career
Bucephalus made his racecourse debut at Beverley in May 1768 in the Ladies' Plate of £50, where he beat Conjuror to win. He was then purchased by Peregrine Wentworth and started as the 1/2 favourite for the Subscription Purse of £361 10s at York. Ridden by Leonard Jewison, he won easily; beating Leith, Rambler and Baber. A few days later he easily beat All-fours over four miles to win 500 guineas. At Newmarket in April 1770 Bucephalus was beaten for the first time, losing a match race to the undefeated Eclipse. It was said that the race was Eclipse's hardest race, but the effort left Bucephalus unfit to run for the rest of the year. After the defeat he was sold to the 1st Earl of Farnham. He ran several more times at Newmarket for the Earl of Farnham, but didn't win any races and was sold back to H. B. Osbaldeston in March 1773. Bucephalus won the four-mile Annual Prize, before being retired from racing.

Stud career
Bucephalus met with some success as a sire. His progeny included Junior, also owned by H. B. Osbaldeston.

Pedigree

References

1764 racehorse births
Racehorses bred in the Kingdom of Great Britain
Racehorses trained in the Kingdom of Great Britain
Thoroughbred racehorses